Adrian Meagher (born 2 April 1959 in Lismore, New South Wales), is an Australian baseball player. He competed at the 2000 Summer Olympics.

References

External links
Adrian Meagher – Baseball-Reference.com profile
Adrian Meagher: Great pitcher a FNC legend – Noosa News

1959 births
Olympic baseball players of Australia
Australian baseball players
Baseball players at the 2000 Summer Olympics
Living people
People from Lismore, New South Wales
Sportsmen from New South Wales